Azamat Kerefov is a Russian mixed martial artist who competes in the Flyweight division of the ACA, where he is the former ACA Flyweight Champion. Fight Matrix had him ranked a top 10 flyweight in the world from July 2020 till October 2022..

Mixed martial arts career
Kerefov started his career as a professional fighter in mixed martial arts in 2014. His debut took place in the TFC - Gladiator Fights tournament, where he met with Andrey Khugaev, Kerefov finished his opponent at the end of the fourth minute of the first round . He fought with various promotions, such as  ACB, ACA, ProFC, Tech-Krep FC, TFC - Gladiator Fights, Heat - Heat 41.

On April 22, 2017, Kerefov made his ACA debut at the  ACB 58: Young Eagles 17 tournament, finishing his opponent, a fighter from Belgium, Hamid Sultanbiev, with a choke hold in the second round.

Kerefov won his next three bouts in ACA via decisions, against Kurban Gadzhiev, Narek Avagyan, and Goga Shamatava.

On February 21, 2020 at the ACA 104: Goncharov vs. Vakhaev won the ACA flyweight champion belt, defeating the titled Russian fighter, ACB flyweight contender, Mansur Khatuev, by unanimous decision.

On November 6, 2020 at the ACA 113: Kerefov vs. Gadzhiev, Kerefov defended the ACA Flyweight Championship in a fight against challenger Kurban Gadzhiez. Azamat Kerefov won by unanimous decision.

Azamat was expected to make his second title defense against the #3 ranked Rasul Albaskhanov at ACA 121: Kerefov vs. Albaskhanov on April 9, 2021. However, 2 days before Kerefov had to withdraw from the bout due to health issues.  The bout was rescheduled for ACA 127: Kerefov vs. Albaskhanov on August 28, 2021. Kerefov won the fight by a third-round technical submission.

After the bout, Kerefov vacated the ACA Flyweight Championship in order to test free agency.

Kerefov faced Felipe Pereira on October 20, 2022 at UAE Warriors 34. He won the bout via unanimous decision.

Championships and accomplishments

Mixed martial arts
Absolute Championship Akhmat
ACA Flyweight Championship (One time)
Two successful title defenses
Tech-Krep FC
PRIME Selection 2016 Tournament Championship (One time)

Mixed martial arts record

|-
| Win
|align=center| 16–0
|Felipe Pereira
| Decision (unanimous)
|UAE Warriors 34
|
|align=center|3
|align=center|5:00
|Abu Dhabi, United Arab Emirates
|
|-
| Win
| align=center|15–0
|Rasul Albaskhanov
|Technical Submission (anaconda choke)
|ACA 127: Kerefov vs. Albaskhanov
|
|align=center|3
|align=center|3:11
|Krasnodar, Russia
| 
|-
| Win
| align=center|14–0
| Kurban Gadzhiev
| Decision (unanimous)
| ACA 113: Kerefov vs. Gadzhiev
| 
| align=center| 5
| align=center| 5:00
| Moscow, Russia
| 
|-
| Win
| align=center|13–0
|Mansur Khatuev
| Decision (unanimous)
| ACA 104: Goncharov vs. Vakhaev
| 
| align=center| 5
| align=center| 5:00
| Krasnodar, Russia
|
|-
| Win
| align=center|12–0
| Goga Shamatava
| Decision (split)
| ACA 97: Goncharov vs. Johnson 2
| 
| align=center| 3
| align=center| 5:00
| Krasnodar, Russia
|
|-
| Win
| align=center|11–0
| Narek Avagyan
| Decision (unanimous)
| ACA 94: Bagov vs. Khaliev
| 
| align=center| 3
| align=center| 5:00
| Krasnodar, Russia
|
|-
| Win
| align=center|10–0
| Kurban Gadzhiev
| Decision (unanimous)
| ACB 89: Abdulvakhabov vs. Bagov 3
| 
| align=center| 3
| align=center| 5:00
| Krasnodar, Russia
|
|-
| Win
| align=center|9–0
| Takeshi Kasugai
| Decision (split)
| HEAT 41
| 
| align=center| 4
| align=center| 5:00
| Nagoya, Japan
|
|-
| Win
| align=center|8–0
| Khamid Sultanbiev
| Decision (unanimous)
| ACB 58: Young Eagles 17
| 
| align=center| 3
| align=center| 5:00
| Khasavyurt, Russia
|
|-
| Win
| align=center| 7–0
| Aren Akopyan
| Decision (unanimous)
| Tech-Krep FC: PRIME Selection 2016 Finals
| 
| align=center| 3
| align=center| 5:00
| Krasnodar, Russia
| 
|-
| Win
| align=center| 6–0
| Evgeny Bondarev
| Decision (unanimous)
| Tech-Krep FC: PRIME Selection 2016 Stage 3
|
| align=center| 2
| align=center| 5:00
|Krasnodar, Russia
| 
|-
| Win
| align=center| 5–0
| Abdulkar Kadilov
| KO (punches)
| Tech-Krep FC: PRIME Selection 2016 Stage 2
| 
| align=center| 1
| align=center| 2:23
| Krasnodar, Russia
| 
|-
| Win
| align=center| 4–0
| Nemat Mamedov
| TKO (punches)
| Armavir MMA Federation: Battle on the Kuban
| 
| align=center| 1
| align=center| 2:23
| Krasnodar, Russia
| 
|-
| Win
| align=center| 3–0
| Shamil Magomedov
| TKO (punches)
| PFC Gladiator 2
| 
| align=center| 1
| align=center| 3:08
| Kabardino-Balkaria, Russia
| 
|-
| Win
| align=center| 2–0
| Khasan Galaev
| Decision (unanimous)
| Battle On Akhtuba 1
| 
| align=center| 3
| align=center| 5:00
| Volgograd, Russia
|
|-
| Win
| align=center| 1–0
| Andrey Khugaev
| Submission (armbar)
| Gladiator Fights 2014
| 
| align=center| 1
| align=center| 3:40
| Nalchik, Russia
|

See also 
 List of current ACA fighters
 List of male mixed martial artists
 List of undefeated mixed martial artists

References

External links 
 

Living people
Russian male mixed martial artists
Flyweight mixed martial artists
1992 births
Sportspeople from Kabardino-Balkaria